Baron Ferrers may refer to:

Baron Ferrers of Chartley
Baron Ferrers of Groby